The Serbian First League (Serbian: Prva liga Srbije) is the second-highest football league in Serbia. The league is operated by the Serbian FA. 18 teams will compete in this league for the 2012-13 season. Two teams will be promoted to the Serbian Superliga and six will be relegated to the Serbian League, the third-highest division overall in the Serbian football league system. From next season, this division will be reduced to 16 clubs, thus 6 teams will be relegated from, and 4 will gain promotion to Serbian First League. The season will begin on 26 August 2012 and end on 5 June 2013.

2012–13 teams

League table

Results

Top goalscorers
Source: Prva liga official website

See also
 Serbian SuperLiga
 Serbian First League
 Serbian League
 Serbia national football team
 List of football clubs in Serbia

References

External links
 Official website
 

Serbian First League seasons
2012–13 in Serbian football leagues
Serbia